Alicia Gómez (born 1992), known professionally as Ali Stone, is a record producer, multi-instrumentalist, singer/songwriter, and DJ from Colombia. She was named by Billboard as one of the Latin hitmakers of 2021.  Stone was one of the opening acts for Justin Bieber's Purpose World Tour.

Early life and musical career 
Ali Stone began to build her life around music from an early childhood. Being four years old, she began to play classical piano. A year later, she began to study the flute, as well as solphège and music theory in a music academy where she was quickly moved to higher-level courses due to her fast learning. At age seven, Ali began to play guitar with Juanes's guitarists, who submerged her into blues, jazz, rock, and metal. She then got to work as a guitarist for renowned multi-platinum producer Stephan Galfas (Kool and The Gang, Cher). Throughout her teenage years, Ali also learned to play the bass and the drums.

In 2013, Ali Stone participated in the contest to remix Disney's "Monsters University" soundtrack, and her work ended up being one of the winners. Axwell & Ingrosso said they had chosen Ali's remix because it was thought "out of the box". In 2014, Ali Stone composed and produced the complete original soundtrack of the thriller "Demental", turning her into one of the youngest female film scorers. Following this, she was chosen to participate in the campaign "Women Working for Women", belonging to the project "Empowering Women", which promotes gender equality on male-dominated jobs.

Earlier in 2015, Ali Stone released her first EP "More Obsessed" on Variety Magazine, consisting of four songs entirely written, produced, performed and engineered by her. Later, she released her single "Forever", which earned the position number 17 on Brazil's hot charts. After being named by Billboard as one of the five new artists to watch in 2016, Ali Stone released her single "Falling For You".

In 2017, Ali Stone performed at the Electric Daisy Carnival in Mexico City. She was also the opener for Justin Bieber's Purpose World Tour in Colombia's section of his Latin American shows. On May 26, 2017, Stone's debut album Sexto Sentido was released, consisting of 12 songs entirely written, produced, mixed and engineered by herself.

Since relocating to Los Angeles in 2018, Ali Stone has been writing and producing songs for the likes of Danna Paola, Alok, RBD, Cami, among others. She has also participated in the She Is The Music song camps for R&B artist Mary J. Blige and reggaeton star Natti Natasha. In 2021, the album Monstruo, where Stone worked as a producer, received a GRAMMY nomination for Best Latin Rock or Alternative Album.

Discography

Albums & EP's 
 Ali Stone - En Mis Manos EP
Ali Stone - Sexto Sentido
Ali Stone - More Obsessed EP
Ali Stone - Demental (Original Motion Picture Soundtrack)

Singles 
 Ali Stone - Crudo
 Ali Stone - Umbra
Ali Stone - Oculto
Ali Stone - The Sweetest Death is Loving You
Ali Stone - Follow Me
Ali Stone - En Tu Piel
 Ali Stone - Dark Feelings ft. Sam I Am 
 Ali Stone - Eres Tu 
 Ali Stone - Falling For You 
 Ali Stone - Forever 
 Ali Stone - Obsessions 
 Ali Stone - Dark Spell 
 Ali Stone - Summerlove 
 Ali Stone - The First Time 
 Ali Stone - More Than Words

Remixes 
 Ke$ha - Crazy Kids (Ali Stone Remix) 
 Monsters University - Roar (Ali Stone Remix) 
 Katy Perry - Roar (Ali Stone Remix)
 Ellie Goulding - Burn (Ali Stone Remix)
 Krewella - We Are One (Ali Stone Remix)
Alok & Mario Bautista - Toda La Noche (Ali Stone Remix)

References

External links 
 Official Website
 

1992 births
Living people
Place of birth missing (living people)
Colombian songwriters
Colombian guitarists
Multi-instrumentalists
Women DJs
English-language singers from Colombia
21st-century guitarists
21st-century women guitarists